Once a Crook is a 1941 British crime film directed by Herbert Mason, produced by Edward Black for 20th Century Fox and featuring Gordon Harker, Sydney Howard, Bernard Lee, Kathleen Harrison, and Raymond Huntley. It is an adaptation to the big screen from a stage play by Evadne Price and Ken Attiwell.

Plot summary

Charlie Hopkins (Gordon Harker) is a retired burglar with an expertise in safecracking.  His ex-partner The Duke (Bernard Lee) holds a grudge against Charlie, since he believes he ratted him out and sent him to jail. The Duke is out for revenge against Charlie, and hires Bill Hopkins (Cyril Cusack), Charlie's son, to help him perform a hit, with an intention to frame the kid. The Duke's plan doesn't work out, since Bill turns out to be an even better safecracker than his old man. After many complications along the road, the hit is a success, and The Duke is bereaved of his revenge, ultimately stopped by his good-hearted sweetheart, Estelle (Carla Lehmann).

Cast
 Gordon Harker as Charlie Hopkins
 Sydney Howard as Hallelujah Harry
 Kathleen Harrison as Auntie
 Carla Lehmann as Estelle
 Bernard Lee as The Duke
 Cyril Cusack as Bill Hopkins
 Diana King as Bessie
 Joss Ambler as Inspector Marsh
 Charles Lamb as Joseph
 Raymond Huntley as Prison Governor
 Felix Aylmer as King's Counsel
 John Salew as Solicitor
 Wally Patch as Warder
 Frank Pettingell as The Captain

References

Bibliography

 Quinlan, David. (1984). British Sound Films: The Studio Years 1928-1959. BT Batsford Ltd

External links 

 Once a Crook at BFI

1941 films
1940s English-language films
1941 crime films
Films directed by Herbert Mason
British black-and-white films
British crime films
1940s British films